Cleopatra General Student Association Groningen is a student association in Groningen, the Netherlands. As of 2006, the association had approximately 280 members.

History 
Cleopatra was founded on December 3, 1985. At the time of its founding, all existing student associations were either traditional/conservative, or Christian, or Frisian. Cleopatra emerged from a tutor group of the Economy faculty of Groningen State University. Legend has it that the tutor group initially proposed to name the new association after their tutor, Theo van Uum. Van Uum objected however. It was only at the notary that the founders named it after the ancient politician Cleopatra.

Mission 
Cleopatra intends to be different from other associations. Its main characteristic is the fact that hazing (a compulsory, often abusive introduction period) is forbidden. Cleopatra resembles many other student associations in the Netherlands in having various substructures (although with different names) and aiming at enhancing the social contact between its members by organising various leisure time activities. The structures include:

 Boats (formalised groups of friends)
 Tribes (introduction groups for new members)
 Committees
 Colleges (special interest groups)
 "Columns" (Zuil, Zeer Uitgebreid Intergratie Lichaam, "Vastly Expanded Integration Body", for various initiatives.

Cleopatra is a member of ZEUS (Zusterlijke Eenheid Uit Saamhorigheid "Sisterly Unity Out Of Concord"), a confederation of alternative student associations in other cities.

External links
 www.cleopatra-groningen.nl

Student societies in the Netherlands